Tanya A. Chaplin (born Tanya A. Service; 1968) is an American gymnastics coach and former artistic gymnast. She is the current head coach of the Oregon State Beavers women's gymnastics program and has been since 1997. An accomplished competitive gymnast, Chaplin attended UCLA and was a member of the UCLA Bruins gymnastics team.

References 

1968 births
Living people
Oregon State Beavers women's gymnastics coaches
American gymnastics coaches
UCLA Bruins women's gymnasts
Sportspeople from St. Louis
Oregon State Beavers women's gymnastics